Mandela Chinweizu Egbo (born 17 August 1997) is an English professional footballer who plays as a right-back for League One club Charlton Athletic.

Club career

Borussia Mönchengladbach
Born in Brent, London, Egbo began his youth career with hometown club Hackney JFC and Afewee Urban before joining Crystal Palace. He moved from Crystal Palace to German club Borussia Mönchengladbach at the age of 17, being assigned to the reserve side. On 24 February 2018, Egbo made his Bundesliga debut for Borussia Mönchengladbach, coming on in the second half for Denis Zakaria in a 1–0 victory over Hannover 96.

Darmstadt
On 21 May 2019, after four years with Borussia Mönchengladbach, Egbo joined 2. Bundesliga side Darmstadt on a free transfer, signing a three-year deal. He made his debut with Darmstadt on 28 July 2019 in the 1–1 away game against Hamburger SV, coming on for Patrick Herrmann in the 68th minute of the match.

New York Red Bulls
On 30 January 2020, Egbo moved to MLS side New York Red Bulls. On 20 August 2020, Egbo made his league debut for New York Red Bulls, coming on in the second half in a 1–0 victory over rival New York City FC. On 23 November 2020, Egbo scored his first goal for New York, on a penalty kick, in a 4–1 victory over Inter Miami.

New York Red Bulls II
During the 2021 season, Egbo was loaned to New York Red Bulls II, he made his season debut on 30 April 2021, starting in a 3–2 loss to Hartford Athletic and scoring a late goal from the penalty spot. On 18 May 2021, Egbo helped New York to a 2–1 victory over Loudoun United, converting the winning goal from the penalty spot. On 23 May 2021, Egbo once again converted from the penalty spot in a 2–2 draw with Charleston Battery.

Following the 2021 season, New York declined their contract option on Egbo.

Swindon Town
On 12 March 2022, Egbo joined Swindon Town on a short-term contract.

Charlton Athletic
On 21 June 2022, Egbo joined Charlton Athletic on a two–year deal – with the option of a third year – following the expiry of his contract at Swindon Town.

International career
Egbo was born in England and is of Nigerian descent. He is a youth international for England and was a part of the squad that won the 2014 UEFA European Under-17 Football Championship.

Career statistics

Honours
England U17
UEFA European Under-17 Championship: 2014

References

External links
 Profile at FuPa.net
 

1997 births
Living people
Footballers from the London Borough of Brent
English footballers
England youth international footballers
English sportspeople of Nigerian descent
Association football defenders
Borussia Mönchengladbach II players
Borussia Mönchengladbach players
SV Darmstadt 98 players
New York Red Bulls players
New York Red Bulls II players
Swindon Town F.C. players
Charlton Athletic F.C. players
Regionalliga players
Bundesliga players
2. Bundesliga players
USL Championship players
Major League Soccer players
English expatriate footballers
English expatriate sportspeople in Germany
Expatriate footballers in Germany
English expatriate sportspeople in the United States
Expatriate soccer players in the United States